Thomas Hornbein (born November 6, 1930) is an American mountaineer.

Biography
Born in St. Louis, Missouri, Hornbein developed an interest in geology as a teenager.  His study of geology led to a fascination with mountains.  Eventually he also became interested in medicine; he received his MD in 1956 from Washington University School of Medicine and worked as an anesthesiologist. He also studied human physiological limits and performance at high altitude. He was Professor and Chairman of the Department of Anesthesiology at the University of Washington School of Medicine in Seattle, Washington from 1978 to 1993. His life was a link of medicine and mountaineering.

Hornbein was an early area climber of Boulder, Colorado in the Flatirons.

Hornbein and his partners Willi Unsoeld and Dick Emerson attempted to climb Mount Everest in 1963 as part of the American Everest Expedition. Jim Whittaker and Nawang Gombu Sherpa from this expedition had summitted on May 1, 1963.  Hornbein, Unsoeld, and Emerson were the first to attempt an ascent of the daunting West Ridge. Previously, ascents of the mountain had been made only via the South Col and Southeast Ridge or the North Col and Northeast Ridge.  Their plan was to climb up the West Ridge and down the Southeast Ridge/South Col route.  This would make theirs the first traverse of an 8000-meter peak.

On May 22, 1963 at 6:50 a.m. they left their final camp and started the climb (Emerson stayed at the high camp due to altitude sickness), and even though progress was very slow made it to the summit at 6:15 that night. They found themselves hours behind the generally accepted schedule and after spending 20 minutes at the top they began the descent. Shortly after they started Unsoeld ran out of oxygen.

At 9:30 they came upon  two other Americans from the same expedition, Barry Bishop and Lute Jerstad. Bishop and Jerstad had reached the summit earlier in the day using the South Col route and by this time were exhausted and nearly out of oxygen. The four climbers joined together on the descent and continued to make very slow progress until they felt it was too dangerous and stopped sometime after midnight.

They huddled together until 4:00 a.m. and started down again, meeting expedition members carrying extra tanks of oxygen. They made it to camp to find Unsoeld’s feet hard and frostbitten. Barry Bishop and Lute Jerstad also suffered from frostbite and Bishop and Unsoeld lost toes as a result.

Hornbein wrote about this night event in his book "Everest: The West Ridge":
"The night was overwhelming empty. The black silhouette of the Lhotse Mountain was lurking there, half to see, half to assume, and below of us. In general there was nothing – simply nothing. We hung in a timeless gap, pained by an intensive cold air – and had the idea not to be able to do anything but to shiver and to wait for the sun arising."

Hornbein named the Hornbein Couloir, a steep gully which he and Unsoeld climbed in the uppermost part of the north wall. In his book Into Thin Air, Jon Krakauer writes that "Hornbein's and Unsoeld's ascent was--and continues to be--deservedly hailed as one of the great feats in the annals of mountaineering."

In the year 2002 Hornbein, 72 years old, was still active as a Professor of Anesthesiology and as a mountaineer. In 2006, he moved from the Seattle area to Estes Park, CO, where he lives with his wife, Kathy Mikesell Hornbein, a retired pediatrician and young adult novelist. They climb regularly in the Colorado Rockies.

Awards 

On April 14, 2018, Hornbein was awarded the Lifetime Achievement Award by The Mountaineers (club), a Seattle-based mountaineering club and publisher of mountaineering books.

Book

References

External links 
 Thomas Hornbein Papers MSS 669. Special Collections & Archives, UC San Diego Library.

American mountain climbers
American summiters of Mount Everest
American anesthesiologists
Living people
Medical educators
University of Washington faculty
Writers from St. Louis
1930 births
Washington University in St. Louis alumni
Washington University School of Medicine alumni